The Abbotsford Air Force was a Canadian Junior Football team based in Abbotsford, British Columbia. The Air Force played in the eight-team B.C. Football Conference, which itself is part of the Canadian Junior Football League (CJFL) and competes annually for the national title known as the Canadian Bowl. The Air Force were founded in 1987.

On May 22, 2007, the Air Force announced they would fall to non-playing status for the 2007 season, due to the inability to secure adequate coaching staff.

External links
Abbotsford Air Force homepage
Canadian Junior Football League

Former Canadian Junior Football League teams
Sport in Abbotsford, British Columbia
1987 establishments in British Columbia
Sports clubs established in 1987